Imperial Wax Solvent is a studio album by the Fall – the band's 26th –  released in the UK on 28 April 2008.

The album featured a new British-based lineup after the departures of the American musicians who had been recruited to salvage a 2006 tour of the US and subsequently appeared on 2007's Reformation Post TLC. Frontman Mark E. Smith, keyboardist Elena Poulou and bassist Dave Spurr remain from the previous incarnation. They were joined on Imperial by guitarist Pete Greenway (a guest guitarist on the previous album) and drummer Keiron Melling. Spurr, Greenway and Melling would prove to be the band's most stable lineup, enduring for six studio albums until Smith's death in 2018.

It was the first Fall album since 2001's Are You Are Missing Winner to have been turned around in a year. An album a year was always the norm for the group in the past but this practice slipped in the period 2001–2007 (2006 was the first year since the group's inception that saw the emergence of no new material at all, with a cover of the Monks' "Higgledy Piggledy" from the tribute album Silver Monk Time being the only recorded appearance).

Imperial Wax Solvent was also the first studio album since Are You Are Missing Winner to make prominent use of the low-fi production techniques which were previously one of the Fall's hallmarks: the Groundhogs cover "Strangetown" has noticeable skips, and certain tracks on the album are presented in mono.

Reception and release
The album was well-received by critics, scoring an 81/100 on Metacritic. The album entered the UK album chart at #35, the Fall's first time on the Top 40 since 1993's The Infotainment Scan reached #9.

The album received some press attention when, due to a pressing error, the music of the album was recorded onto the first shipment of Faryl Smith's debut album Faryl.

Imperial Wax Solvent was reissued by Cherry Red Records on limited edition translucent yellow vinyl for Record Store Day 2019 and as an expanded 3CD edition in 2020.

Track listing

"Strangetown" includes elements of "Garden", also written by McPhee and originally performed by the Groundhogs.

2020 expanded edition
Disc 1 - original album 
as per original edition

Disc 2 - Britannia Row recordings 21/9/07
Unused recordings made at Britannia Row Studios in London.

Disc 3 - De La Warr Pavilion, Bexhill on Sea, East Sussex 10/5/08 
An entire live set recorded at De La Warr Pavilion, Bexhill on Sea, East Sussex.

Personnel 
The Fall
 Mark E. Smith - vocals, production
 Eleni Poulou - keyboards, vocals, lead vocals on "I've Been Duped"
 Peter Greenway - guitar
 David Spurr - bass guitar
 Keiron Melling - drums
Technical
 Grant Showbiz - production
 Andi Toma - production
 Tim Baxter - production
 Tom Pritchard - engineering
 Simon 'Dingo' Archer - engineering
 Olliver Groscheck - engineering
 Anthony Frost - cover art

Notes

References

2008 albums
The Fall (band) albums
Albums produced by Grant Showbiz